Beitbridge East is a constituency of the National Assembly of the Parliament of Zimbabwe. Located in Matabeleland South Province, is currently represented by Albert Nguluvhe of ZANU–PF. Previously, it was represented by Kembo Mohadi.

Members

References 

Beitbridge
Matabeleland South Province
Parliamentary constituencies in Zimbabwe